Joris De Loore (born 21 April 1993) is a Belgian tennis player. He competes mainly on the ATP Challenger Tour circuit.

De Loore has a career high ATP singles ranking of 174 achieved on 17 October 2016. That week he made his ATP Tour debut, where he pushed future top 10 star Taylor Fritz close in a 6-3 4-6 4-6 defeat in Antwerp. He also has a career high ATP doubles ranking of 263, achieved on 24 December 2018. De Loore has won one ATP Challenger and ten ITF singles titles and 12 doubles titles.

In January 2023, he won his maiden Challenger in Oeiras becoming the oldest winner at 29 since 2015, when Italian Luca Vanni won his maiden title at 31. He then reached the final in the second edition of the Challenger in  Oeiras and moved close to 50 positions up to No. 219 on 16 January 2023.

De Loore has represented Belgium at the Davis Cup where he has a W/L record of 3–4.

Challenger and Futures/World Tennis Tour Finals

Singles: 27 (12-15)

References

External links

 
 
 

1993 births
Living people
Belgian male tennis players
Sportspeople from Bruges